The Vidarbha Cricket Association is the governing body of the Cricket activities in the Vidarbha region in Maharashtra state of India and the Vidarbha cricket team. It is affiliated to the Board of Control for Cricket in India.
 
N. K. P. Salve remained President of Vidarbha Cricket Association from 1972 to 1980, he later remained president of Board of Control for Cricket in India from 1982 to 1985.

References 

Cricket administration in India
Cricket in Maharashtra
Vidarbha
Cricket in Vidarbha
1956 establishments in Bombay State
Sports organizations established in 1956